Picross 3D, known in Japan as , is a puzzle video game developed by HAL Laboratory and published by Nintendo for the Nintendo DS. It was released in Japan in March 2009, in Europe in March 2010, and in North America in May 2010. It uses similar nonogram mechanics to Picross DS, but it puts it in 3D. Outside Japan, the game is part of Nintendo's Touch! Generations brand. A sequel, Picross 3D: Round 2, was released for the Nintendo 3DS in Japan in October 2015, in North America in September 2016, and in Europe and Australia in December 2016.

Gameplay
While Picross presents a rectangular grid of squares, which must be filled in to create a picture, Picross 3D uses a rectangular prism made of a number of smaller cubes, and must be chipped away in order to construct an image in three dimensions. Each row or column has at most one number corresponding to it, and many do not have any numbers at all; the number indicates how many cubes the row/column should contain when the picture is complete. Generally each row of cubes will be in one group. If a number has a circle around it, it means that, while that number of cubes is the total amount in the row/column, they will be split up into two groups (for example, a 4 with a circle around it will be in two groups of either 1 and 3, or 2 and 2). If a number has a square around it, the cubes will be split up into three or more groups. If there are no numbers on a row or column, there are no rules regarding the cubes in that row.

A paintbrush may be used to mark cubes that definitely will remain in the image (which also prevents them from being broken accidentally), or a hammer to chip away at the unnecessary cubes. If an attempt is made to break a cube that is part of the image, the game will count this as a strike. If the player receives five strikes, the player is out and will have to start the puzzle over again.  Players will also need to complete the stage within a certain amount of time. Early on, the game will show players "technique" tutorials to help them refine their puzzle-solving skills.

Once a 3D image is completed, the player will be rewarded with a short animation regarding the image, and it will be placed into a themed collection, encouraging players to complete each collection. During standard puzzles, up to three stars are awarded based on the player's performance (completing the puzzle within a certain time limit and with no strikes earns maximum stars) which unlock additional bonus puzzles in each level. In between certain levels are "One-Chance Challenges", where players are out if they make just one mistake, "Time Challenges", which require players to quickly chip away cubes to extend their time limit, and "Construction Challenges" in which multiple puzzles are completed to form one giant image. Bonus animations can also be unlocked under certain conditions, such as completing each difficulty setting.

Outside of the main mode, players could also download additional puzzles via the Nintendo Wi-Fi Connection, as well as create their own puzzles, which can be shared with friends or entered into themed challenges. While it is no longer possible to use the Nintendo WFC for downloading or sharing puzzles since it was shut down in 2014, it is still possible to send and receive puzzles locally using wireless transfer.

Reception

Sales
The game was the third best-selling game during the week of its release in Japan at 38,000 copies. It sold an additional 29,000 copies and 16,000 copies its second and third weeks respectively.

See also
Picross 3D: Round 2, the successor to Picross 3D, for the 3DS.
Picross DS, a Picross game made by Nintendo and Jupiter for the Nintendo DS.

References

2009 video games
HAL Laboratory games
Nintendo DS games
Virtual Console games for Wii U
Nintendo franchises
Nintendo Wi-Fi Connection games
Picross (video game series)
Nonograms
Puzzle video games
Touch! Generations
Video games developed in Japan
Video games with downloadable content
Video games produced by Kensuke Tanabe
Single-player video games